In the Shadow is a 2012 Czech crime film directed by David Ondříček. The film was selected as the Czech entry for the Best Foreign Language Oscar at the 85th Academy Awards, but it did not make the final shortlist.

Cast
 Ivan Trojan as Captain Hakl
 Sebastian Koch as Major Zenke
 Soňa Norisová as Jitka
 Jiří Štěpnička as Pánek
 David Švehlík as Beno
 Marek Taclík as Bareš
 Filip Antonio as Tom
 Martin Myšička as Jílek
 Miroslav Krobot as Kirsch
 Halka Třešňáková as translator
 Simona Babčáková as researcher

Awards
In the Shadow won nine Czech Lions at the 2012 awards.

See also
 List of submissions to the 85th Academy Awards for Best Foreign Language Film
 List of Czech submissions for the Academy Award for Best Foreign Language Film

References

External links
 

2012 films
2012 crime thriller films
2010s Czech-language films
Czech detective films
Czech crime thriller films
Czech Lion Awards winners (films)
Czech neo-noir films
Czech Film Critics' Awards winners